Adenia fruticosa is a species of flowering plant in the passionflower family, Passifloraceae. It is native to southern Africa.

References

fruticosa
Flora of South Africa
Plants described in 1926
Caudiciform plants